Qurban Ali Urozgani was the previous governor of Daykundi Province of Afghanistan. He was selected as governor by President Karzai in April 2010. He belongs to Hazara ethnic of Afghanistan.

Early life 
Urozgani  was born on 21 March 1958 in Khas Urozgan District of Urozgan Province. His father, Mirza Muhammad Essa, was a government employee in Helmand Province. Urozgani graduated from Technical Agriculture High School in 1979. During the university life, he started participating in anti-Soviet political parties, for which he had to quit education.

Political career 
After the September 11 attacks, on the establishment of new government in Afghanistan, Urozgani was nominated as one of the people's Representative of Helmand province. In 2009, Urozgani was selected as the new governor of Daykundi Province after Jan Mohammad Akbari until 2012.

See also 

 List of Hazara people

Notes

References 
 afghan-bios.info/Qurban Ali Urozgani

External links 
 Oruzgani's Personal Website

Governors of Daykundi Province
Living people
1959 births
Hazara politicians
People from Urozgan Province